Treaty of Chudnov or Treaty of Cudnów was a treaty between the Polish–Lithuanian Commonwealth  and the Cossacks, signed in Chudniv (Polish: Cudnów) on 17 October 1660 during the Chmielnicki Rebellion. It restored most of the provisions of the Treaty of Hadiach, except for the elevation of Ruthenia to the status equal of the Poland  and Lithuania. It invalidated the Pereyaslav Articles.

The treaty was signed following the Polish victory at the Battle of Chudnov.  The treaty meant that the Cossacks withdrew their support from Russia in the Russo-Polish War (1654–67), and transferred it back to the Commonwealth. The war would eventually be concluded with the 1667 Treaty of Andrusovo.

References

1658 in the Polish–Lithuanian Commonwealth
Poland–Ukraine military relations
1660 treaties
Chudnov
Chudnov
17th century in the Zaporozhian Host